"I Don't Fuck with You", also known by the initialism "IDFWU", is a song by American rapper Big Sean, featuring E-40, released on September 19, 2014, as the lead single from his third studio album Dark Sky Paradise (2015).

Background and release
On March 19, 2014, Justin Bieber uploaded to Instagram  a snippet of "Turn Up", which has the same beat. The record was supposed to be Justin's, but there was no communication with the management, so producer DJ Mustard decided to give the record to Big Sean. On September 12, 2014, Big Sean announced he had signed with Roc Nation for a management deal, but stated he was still with GOOD Music. "I Don't Fuck with You" was released on the same day with three more new songs: "Paradise", "4th Quarter", and "Jit / Juke". Producers included Mike Will Made It, DJ Dahi, Nate Fox, Da Internz, L&F, and Key Wane.

"I Don't Fuck with You" was produced by DJ Mustard and Kanye West and samples the 1976 D. J. Rogers song "Say You Love Me One More Time". Closing adlibs are performed over a slowed down version of the 1978 Earth, Wind & Fire song "September".  The clean edit of the song produced for radio airplay does not contain either the word "fuck" or other words in the lyrics prohibited by the FCC.

Lyrics
Sean had been in a relationship with actress Naya Rivera and the couple announced their engagement in October 2013, but Sean ended the relationship in April 2014. Rivera then began dating actor Ryan Dorsey, whom she married  on July 19, 2014, the original date set for her wedding to Big Sean. Although it was widely speculated that Sean wrote the song about the end of his relationship with Rivera, he denied that the song is about her. In a September 2020 interview, following Rivera's death, he stated he wished he never made the song: "I don't feel comfortable talking about it because I want to respect her. She's made such an impact on people, and she's done so many great things in her life and her career that it was hurtful to even have that [song] be associated with her. It wasn't a diss to her. I truly made the song and played it for her. She knew about it, and she liked it. We had a breakup that was very public, and we were young and we forgave each other and moved on from that".

Commercial performance
"I Don't Fuck with You" peaked at number 11 on the US Billboard Hot 100, becoming Big Sean's third highest-charting single on the chart and E-40's second-highest. It also marked Big Sean's seventh and E-40's fifth top 20 single. As of February 2015, the song has sold 1,268,000 copies in the US.

Music video
The official music video, directed by Lawrence Lamont, was released on November 6, 2014. It portrays Big Sean as a quarterback during a high school football game, and E-40 as a commentator. The song's producers, Kanye West and DJ Mustard, appear in the video along with Naya Rivera, Fort Minor, The A'z and internet celebrities  Simone Shepherd and Khalil Underwood.

Usage in other media 
The song is featured in the films American Honey, Fist Fight, and Transformers: The Last Knight.

Charts

Weekly charts

Year-end charts

Certifications

References

2014 singles
2014 songs
Big Sean songs
Def Jam Recordings singles
GOOD Music singles
Song recordings produced by Mustard (record producer)
Song recordings produced by Kanye West
Songs written by Big Sean
Songs written by E-40
Songs written by Kanye West
Songs written by Mustard (record producer)